One of the foundational definitions in the field of organizational development (aka OD) is planned change:

According to Beckard defines that 
“Organization Development is an effort planned, organization-wide, and managed from the top, to increase organization effectiveness and health through planned interventions in the organization's 'processes,' using behavioral-science knowledge.”

-- Beckard, “Organization development: Strategies and Models”, Reading, MA: soweto mbeya, 2013, p. 9.

To understand the practice of OD, some of the key terms, embedded in James's formulation, include:

 Planned - carefully thought through; based on data; documented
 Effectiveness - as measured by actual organizational performance versus desired organizational performance
 Health - as measured by the organization's ability to respond, grow and adapt in its environmental context
 Intervention - the specific action(s) selected for implementation that are intended to bring about the envisioned change
 Processes - how work gets done in an organization; e.g. delivery of service, billing, repair, etc.

See also
 Change management
 managing change

External links
 Minnesota OD Network:  https://web.archive.org/web/20050407130220/http://www.mnodn.org/about_OD/od_defn.htm

Business terms
Change management